"One Night of Cheatin' (Ain't Worth the Reapin')" is a single by Canadian country music artist Carroll Baker. Released in 1975, it was the third single from her album Carroll Baker. It reached number one on Canada's RPM Country Tracks chart in March 1976.

Chart performance

References

1975 singles
Carroll Baker songs
1975 songs
RCA Records singles